Eve Cone is a well-preserved black cinder cone on the Big Raven Plateau, British Columbia, Canada. It is one of the 30 cinder cones on the flanks of the massive shield volcano of Mount Edziza that formed in the year 700, making it one of the most recent eruptions on the Big Raven Plateau and in Canada. Eve Cone stands by itself in the middle of the Desolation Lava Field and its distinctive shape can be seen from a long distance. Commonly photographed , Eve Cone is covered by light yellow pumice from a close by but unknown vent.

See also
List of volcanoes in Canada
List of Northern Cordilleran volcanoes
Northern Cordilleran Volcanic Province
Volcanism of Canada
Volcanism of Western Canada

References

Cinder cones of British Columbia
Mount Edziza volcanic complex
Holocene volcanoes
Monogenetic cinder cones
One-thousanders of British Columbia